The Downtown Manhattan Historic District in Manhattan, Kansas is a  historic district which was listed on the National Register of Historic Places in 2007.   The district generally includes the blocks between Humboldt and Pierre Sts. from 3rd to 5th Sts.

The district includes 48 contributing buildings and 15 non-contributing buildings.  Selected buildings are:
Manhattan State Bank Building (1906), 400 Poyntz
Wareham Theater (1910), 408-412 Poyntz

References

Historic districts on the National Register of Historic Places in Kansas
Queen Anne architecture in Kansas
Early Commercial architecture in the United States
Manhattan, Kansas
Riley County, Kansas